WDKB (94.9 FM) is a radio station that broadcasts a hot adult contemporary format. Licensed to DeKalb, Illinois, the station is owned by Mid-West Family Broadcasting, through licensee Long Nine, Inc.

History
The station began broadcasting on August 13, 1990, airing an adult contemporary format with the branding "B95", and was owned by DeKalb County Radio, Limited.

Effective August 31, 2018, the station was sold by DeKalb County Radio to Mid-West Family Broadcasting for $650,000.

On November 30, 2018, WDKB shifted its format to hot adult contemporary, branded as "94.9 WDKB".

As of August 2022, 94.9 WDKB is now the home for NIU sports.

Previous logo

References

External links
WDKB's website

DKB
Hot adult contemporary radio stations in the United States
Radio stations established in 1990
1990 establishments in Illinois